Haghtanak may refer to two different towns in Armenia:
Haghtanak, Tavush, in Tavush Province in northeastern Armenia;
Haghtanak, Yerevan, near the Armenian capital, Yerevan.